India competed at the 2022 World Games held in Birmingham, United States from 7 to 17 July 2022. Athletes representing India won one bronze medal and the country finished in 70th place in the medal table.

Medalists

Competitors

Archery

India competed in archery.

Men

Women

Mixed team

Cue sports

India competed in cue sports.

Road speed skating

India competed in road speed skating.

Track speed skating

India competed in track speed skating.

Wushu

India competed in wushu.

References

Nations at the 2022 World Games
2022
World Games